Keith Matthews may refer to:
 Keith Matthews (footballer) (1934–2008), Welsh footballer
 Keith Matthews (historian) (1938–1984), British-born historian of Newfoundland
 Keith Matthews (rugby union) (born 1982), Irish rugby union player